Noorda caradjae is a moth in the family Crambidae. It was described by Rebel in 1902. It has been recorded from the Jordan Valley.

References

Moths described in 1902
Crambidae